Slíva is a surname. Notable people with the surname include:

David Slíva, Czech tennis player
Josef Slíva (1898–?), Czech figure skater

See also
Silva

Czech-language surnames